The Butler Way is a term used since the 2006–2007 men's NCAA college basketball season by broadcasters and sportswriters nationwide to describe the governing philosophy of the Butler Bulldogs, one of the most successful former mid-major programs.   The Butler Way demands commitment, denies selfishness and accepts reality, yet seeks constant improvement while promoting the good of the team above self.

History of the term
The Butler Way was originally forged by Butler University's legendary coach and administrator Tony Hinkle.

The five principles
The Butler Way has become closely associated with the five principles of Butler Basketball.  The five principles as posted in the Men's Basketball locker-room are as follows:

Humility - know who we are, strengths and weaknesses
Passion - do not be lukewarm, commit to excellence
Unity - do not divide our house, team first
Servanthood - make teammates better, lead by giving
Thankfulness - learn from every circumstance

See also
Team work
Seven Point Creed

References

Butler Way